The taʿlīq script is a style in Islamic calligraphy designed specifically to satisfy the needs of the Persian language. It emerged in the mid-13th century from gradual changes in the naskh style, and also incorporated influences from riqa and tawqi. It was widely used, especially in Persianate societies, until being replaced by the Nastaliq script, itself a derivative of ta'liq.

Taʿlīq is also generally used as the name for the Nastaliq script in the Turkish language and often in the Arabic language.

See also
Naskh script
Nastaliq

References

Islamic calligraphy
Persian calligraphy
Persian orthography